Literary theory is the systematic study of the nature of literature and of the methods for literary analysis. Since the 19th century, literary scholarship includes literary theory and considerations of intellectual history, moral philosophy, social prophecy, and interdisciplinary themes relevant to how people interpret meaning. In the humanities in modern academia, the latter style of literary scholarship is an offshoot of post-structuralism. Consequently, the word theory became an umbrella term for scholarly approaches to reading texts, some of which are informed by strands of semiotics, cultural studies, philosophy of language, and continental philosophy.

History
The practice of literary theory became a profession in the 20th century, but it has historical roots that run as far back as ancient Greece (Aristotle's Poetics is an often cited early example), ancient India (Bharata Muni's Natya Shastra), and ancient Rome (Longinus's On the Sublime). In medieval times, scholars in the Middle East (Al-Jahiz's al-Bayan wa-'l-tabyin and al-Hayawan, and ibn al-Mu'tazz's Kitab al-Badi) and Europe continued to produce works based on literary studies. The aesthetic theories of philosophers from ancient philosophy through the 18th and 19th centuries are important influences on current literary study. The theory and criticism of literature are tied to the history of literature.

However, the modern sense of "literary theory" only dates to approximately the 1950s when the structuralist linguistics of Ferdinand de Saussure began to strongly influence English language literary criticism. The New Critics and various European-influenced formalists (particularly the Russian Formalists) had described some of their more abstract efforts as "theoretical" as well. But it was not until the broad impact of structuralism began to be felt in the English-speaking academic world that "literary theory" was thought of as a unified domain.

In the academic world of the United Kingdom and the United States, literary theory was at its most popular from the late 1960s (when its influence was beginning to spread outward from elite universities such as Johns Hopkins, Yale, and Cornell) through the 1980s (by which time it was taught nearly everywhere in some form). During this span of time, literary theory was perceived as academically cutting-edge, and most university literature departments sought to teach and study theory and incorporate it into their curricula. Because of its meteoric rise in popularity and the difficult language of its key texts, theory was also often criticized as faddish or trendy obscurantism (and many academic satire novels of the period, such as those by David Lodge, feature theory prominently). Some scholars, both theoretical and anti-theoretical, refer to the 1980s and 1990s debates on the academic merits of theory as "the theory wars".

By the early 1990s, the popularity of "theory" as a subject of interest by itself was declining slightly (along with job openings for pure "theorists") even as the texts of literary theory were incorporated into the study of almost all literature. By 2010, the controversy over the use of theory in literary studies had quieted down, and discussions on the topic within literary and cultural studies tend now to be considerably milder and less lively. However, some scholars like Mark Bauerlein continue to argue that less capable theorists have abandoned proven methods of epistemology, resulting in persistent lapses in learning, research, and evaluation. Some scholars do draw heavily on theory in their work, while others only mention it in passing or not at all; but it is an acknowledged, important part of the study of literature.

Overview
One of the fundamental questions of literary theory is "what is literature?" – although many contemporary theorists and literary scholars believe either that  "literature" cannot be defined or that it can refer to any use of language. Specific theories are distinguished not only by their methods and conclusions, but even by how they create meaning in a "text". However, some theorists acknowledge that these texts do not have a singular, fixed meaning which is deemed "correct".

Since theorists of literature often draw on a very heterogeneous tradition of Continental philosophy and the philosophy of language, any classification of their approaches is only an approximation. There are many types of literary theory, which take different approaches to texts. Even among those listed below, many scholars combine methods from more than one of these approaches (for instance, the deconstructive approach of Paul de Man drew on a long tradition of close reading pioneered by the New Critics, and de Man was trained in the European hermeneutic tradition).

Broad schools of theory that have historically been important include historical and biographical criticism, New Criticism, formalism, Russian formalism, and structuralism, post-structuralism, Marxism, feminism and French feminism, post-colonialism, new historicism, deconstruction, reader-response criticism, and psychoanalytic criticism.

Differences among schools 

The different interpretive and epistemological perspectives of different schools of theory often arise from, and so give support to, different moral and political commitments. For instance, the work of the New Critics often contained an implicit moral dimension, and sometimes even a religious one: a New Critic might read a poem by T. S. Eliot or Gerard Manley Hopkins for its degree of honesty in expressing the torment and contradiction of a serious search for belief in the modern world. Meanwhile, a Marxist critic might find such judgments merely ideological rather than critical; the Marxist would say that the New Critical reading did not keep enough critical distance from the poem's religious stance to be able to understand it. Or a post-structuralist critic might simply avoid the issue by understanding the religious meaning of a poem as an allegory of meaning, treating the poem's references to "God" by discussing their referential nature rather than what they refer to.

Such a disagreement cannot be easily resolved, because it is inherent in the radically different terms and goals (that is, the theories) of the critics. Their theories of reading derive from vastly different intellectual traditions: the New Critic bases his work on an East-Coast American scholarly and religious tradition, while the Marxist derives his thought from a body of critical social and economic thought, the post-structuralist's work emerges from twentieth-century Continental philosophy of language.

In the late 1950s, the Canadian literary critic Northrop Frye attempted to establish an approach for reconciling historical criticism and New Criticism while addressing concerns of early reader-response and numerous psychological and social approaches. His approach, laid out in his Anatomy of Criticism, was explicitly structuralist, relying on the assumption of an intertextual "order of words" and universality of certain structural types. His approach held sway in English literature programs for several decades but lost favor during the ascendance of post-structuralism.

For some theories of literature (especially certain kinds of formalism), the distinction between "literary" and other sorts of texts is of paramount importance. Other schools (particularly post-structuralism in its various forms: new historicism, deconstruction, some strains of Marxism and feminism) have sought to break down distinctions between the two and have applied the tools of textual interpretation to a wide range of "texts", including film, non-fiction, historical writing, and even cultural events.

Mikhail Bakhtin argued that the "utter inadequacy" of literary theory is evident when it is forced to deal with the novel; while other genres are fairly stabilized, the novel is still developing.

Another crucial distinction among the various theories of literary interpretation is intentionality, the amount of weight given to the author's own opinions about and intentions for a work. For most pre-20th century approaches, the author's intentions are a guiding factor and an important determiner of the "correct" interpretation of texts. The New Criticism was the first school to disavow the role of the author in interpreting texts, preferring to focus on "the text itself" in a close reading. In fact, as much contention as there is between formalism and later schools, they share the tenet that the author's interpretation of a work is no more inherently meaningful than any other.

Schools
Listed below are some of the most commonly identified schools of literary theory, along with their major authors:

 Aestheticism – associated with Romanticism, a philosophy defining aesthetic value as the primary goal in understanding literature. This includes both literary critics who have tried to understand and/or identify aesthetic values and those like Oscar Wilde who have stressed art for art's sake.
 Oscar Wilde, Walter Pater, Harold Bloom
 African-American literary theory
 American pragmatism and other American approaches
 Harold Bloom, Stanley Fish, Richard Rorty
 Cognitive literary theory – applies research in cognitive science and philosophy of mind to the study of literature and culture.
 Frederick Luis Aldama, Mary Thomas Crane, Nancy Easterlin, William Flesch, David Herman, Suzanne Keen, Patrick Colm Hogan, Alan Richardson, Ellen Spolsky, Blakey Vermeule, Lisa Zunshine
 Cambridge criticism – close examination of the literary text and the relation of literature to social issues
I.A. Richards, F.R. Leavis, Q.D. Leavis, William Empson.
 Critical race theory
 Cultural studies – emphasizes the role of literature in everyday life 
 Raymond Williams, Dick Hebdige, and Stuart Hall (British Cultural Studies); Max Horkheimer and Theodor Adorno; Michel de Certeau; also Paul Gilroy, John Guillory
 Dark Side of the Rainbow – a strategy of analyzing works with the accompaniment of music and finding and extrapolating thematic similarities between the two, named after a popular practice that came about in the 1970s
Darwinian literary studies – situates literature in the context of evolution and natural selection
 Deconstruction – a strategy of "close" reading that elicits the ways that key terms and concepts may be paradoxical or self-undermining, rendering their meaning undecidable
 Jacques Derrida, Paul de Man, J. Hillis Miller, Philippe Lacoue-Labarthe, Gayatri Spivak, Avital Ronell
 Descriptive poetics
 Brian McHale
Feminist literary criticism
 Eco-criticism – explores cultural connections and human relationships to the natural world
 Gender (see feminist literary criticism) – which emphasizes themes of gender relations
 Luce Irigaray, Judith Butler, Hélène Cixous, Julia Kristeva, Elaine Showalter
 Formalism – a school of literary criticism and literary theory having mainly to do with structural purposes of a particular text
 German hermeneutics and philology
 Friedrich Schleiermacher, Wilhelm Dilthey, Hans-Georg Gadamer, Erich Auerbach, René Wellek
 Marxism (see Marxist literary criticism) – which emphasizes themes of class conflict
 Georg Lukács, Valentin Voloshinov, Raymond Williams, Terry Eagleton, Fredric Jameson, Theodor Adorno, Walter Benjamin
 Narratology
 New Criticism – looks at literary works on the basis of what is written, and not at the goals of the author or biographical issues
 W. K. Wimsatt, F. R. Leavis, John Crowe Ransom, Cleanth Brooks, Robert Penn Warren
 New historicism – which examines the work through its historical context and seeks to understand cultural and intellectual history through literature
 Stephen Greenblatt, Louis Montrose, Jonathan Goldberg, H. Aram Veeser
 Postcolonialism – focuses on the influences of colonialism in literature, especially regarding the historical conflict resulting from the exploitation of less developed countries and indigenous peoples by Western nations
 Edward Said, Gayatri Chakravorty Spivak, Homi Bhabha and Declan Kiberd
 Postmodernism – criticism of the conditions present in the twentieth century, often with concern for those viewed as social deviants or the Other
 Michel Foucault, Roland Barthes, Gilles Deleuze, Félix Guattari and Maurice Blanchot
 Post-structuralism – a catch-all term for various theoretical approaches (such as deconstruction) that criticize or go beyond Structuralism's aspirations to create a rational science of culture by extrapolating the model of linguistics to other discursive and aesthetic formations
 Roland Barthes, Michel Foucault, Julia Kristeva
 Psychoanalysis (see psychoanalytic literary criticism) – explores the role of consciousnesses and the unconscious in literature including that of the author, reader, and characters in the text
 Sigmund Freud, Jacques Lacan, Harold Bloom, Slavoj Žižek, Viktor Tausk
 Queer theory – examines, questions, and criticizes the role of gender identity and sexuality in literature
 Judith Butler, Eve Kosofsky Sedgwick, Michel Foucault
 Reader-response criticism – focuses upon the active response of the reader to a text
 Louise Rosenblatt, Wolfgang Iser, Norman Holland, Hans-Robert Jauss, Stuart Hall
 Realist
James Wood
 Russian formalism
Victor Shklovsky, Vladimir Propp
 Structuralism and semiotics (see semiotic literary criticism) – examines the universal underlying structures in a text, the linguistic units in a text and how the author conveys meaning through any structures
 Ferdinand de Saussure, Roman Jakobson, Claude Lévi-Strauss, Roland Barthes, Mikhail Bakhtin, Juri Lotman, Umberto Eco, Jacques Ehrmann, Northrop Frye and morphology of folklore
 Other theorists: Robert Graves, Alamgir Hashmi, John Sutherland, Leslie Fiedler, Kenneth Burke, Paul Bénichou, Barbara Johnson, Blanca de Lizaur

See also

Notes

References 
 Peter Barry. Beginning Theory: An Introduction to Literary and Cultural Theory. .
 Jonathan Culler. (1997) Literary Theory: A Very Short Introduction. Oxford: Oxford University Press. .
 Terry Eagleton. Literary Theory: An Introduction. .
 Terry Eagleton. After Theory. .
 Jean-Michel Rabaté. The Future of Theory. .
 The Johns Hopkins Guide to Literary Theory and Criticism. .
 Modern Criticism and Theory: A Reader. Ed. David Lodge and Nigel Wood. 2nd Ed. 
 Theory's Empire: An Anthology of Dissent. Ed. Daphne Patai and Will H. Corral. .
Bakhtin, M. M. (1981) The Dialogic Imagination: Four Essays. Ed. Michael Holquist. Trans. Caryl Emerson and Michael Holquist. Austin and London: University of Texas Press.
 René Wellek. A History of Modern Criticism: 1750–1950. Yale University Press, 1955–1992, 8 volumes.

Further reading
 
 Castle, Gregory. Blackwell Guide to Literary Theory. Malden, MA: Blackwell Publishing, 2007.
 Culler, Jonathan. The Literary in Theory. Stanford: Stanford University Press, 2007.
 Terry Eagleton. Literary Theory. Minneapolis: University of Minnesota Press, 2008. (http://www.upress.umn.edu/)
 Literary Theory: An Anthology. Edited by Julie Rivkin and Michael Ryan. Malden, MA: Blackwell Publishing, 2004.
 Lisa Zunshine, ed. Introduction to Cognitive Cultural Studies. Baltimore: The Johns Hopkins University Press, 2010

External links 

 Aristotle's Poetics (350 BCE)
 Longinus's On the Sublime (1st century CE)
 Sir Philip Sidney's Defence of Poesie (1595)
 "A Bibliography of Literary Theory, Criticism and Philology", by José Ángel García Landa
 "Some Literary Criticism quotes", by Tim Love
 The Litcrit Toolkit
 Internet Encyclopedia of Philosophy:   "Literary Theory," by Vince Brewton
 Annotated bibliography on literary theory
 Critical Literary Theory 
 Introduction to Theory 
 Encyclopedia of Philosophy
 Purdue OWL 
 Johns Hopkins Guide

 
Interpretation (philosophy)
Communication theory